Public Transport Authority may refer to:

 Public Transport Authority (Denmark)
 Public Transport Authority (Warsaw)
 Public Transport Authority (Western Australia)
 Public Transportation Authority in Jämtland County
 Public transport authority as in transportation authority